Cyperus impolitus is a species of sedge that is native to parts of South America.

The species was first formally described by the botanist Carl Sigismund Kunth in 1837.

See also
 List of Cyperus species

References

impolitus
Plants described in 1837
Taxa named by Carl Sigismund Kunth
Flora of Argentina
Flora of Brazil
Flora of Chile
Flora of Paraguay
Flora of Uruguay